Stephen Dade (13 August 1909 in Beckenham, Kent – 1975 in Kent) was a British cinematographer.

Selected filmography

 Sailors Don't Care (1940)
 Somewhere in Camp (1942)
 Front Line Kids  (1942)
 The Missing Million (1942)
 Gert and Daisy's Weekend (1942)
 Gert and Daisy Clean Up (1942)
 We'll Meet Again (1943)
 Get Cracking (1943)
 Up with the Lark (1943)
 A Place of One's Own (1945)
 Caravan (1946)
 The Brothers (1947)
 Dear Murderer (1947)
 Good-Time Girl (1948)
 Snowbound (1948)
 The Bad Lord Byron (1949)
 Christopher Columbus (1949)
 Don't Ever Leave Me (1949)
 The Dancing Years (1950)
 The Late Edwina Black (1952)
 Appointment in London (1953)
 The Sea Shall Not Have Them (1954)
 The Flesh is Weak (1957)
 A Question of Adultery (1958)
 The Angry Hills (1959)
 Bluebeard's Ten Honeymoons (1960)
 A Terrible Beauty (1960)
 Doctor Blood's Coffin (1961)
 The Snake Woman (1961)
 The Gentle Terror (1961)
 Double Bunk (1961)
 Three on a Spree (1961)
 Dentist on the Job (1961)
 Ambush in Leopard Street (1962)
 Serena (1962)
 Don't Talk to Strange Men (1962)
 The Switch (1963)
 Zulu (1964)
 Coast of Skeletons (1964)
 The Crooked Road (1965)
 Dateline Diamonds (1965)
 Night Caller from Outer Space (1965)
 The Viking Queen (1967)

References

External links
 

1909 births
1975 deaths
People from Beckenham
British cinematographers